A Bachelor of Dance, often abbreviated as B.Dance, BFA (Dance), BCA (Dance), BDanceEd, BDancePerf, BA (Dance),  is an undergraduate academic degree awarded by a college, university, or conservatory upon completion of program of study in dance.

Students that are interested in pursuing a professional career in dance, can apply for a BA or BFA Dance program.

Application Requirements 
In addition to submitting the application, dancers will have to provide proof of their dance experience and in most cases an in-person audition.

Long Island University's BFA program requires undergraduate applicants to have a minimum GPA of 3.0.

In Australia, the Bachelor of Dance is offered at the following universities under different names:

 University of New South Wales - Bachelor of Arts (Dance Studies); Bachelor of Arts (Dance)/Bachelor of Education.
 Macquarie University - Bachelor of Arts (majoring in Dance).
 Queensland University of Technology - Bachelor of Fine Arts (Dance Performance).
 TAFE South Australia - Bachelor of Dance Performance.
 University of Melbourne (through the Victorian College of the Arts) - Bachelor of Fine Arts (Dance); Master of Fine Arts (Dance); Master of Choreography.
 Deakin University - Bachelor of Arts (Dance), can be combined with a Bachelor of Science, Bachelor of Teaching (Secondary), or Bachelor of Laws. 
 Edith Cowan University (through the Western Australian Academy of Performing Arts) - Bachelor of Arts (Dance); Advanced Diploma of Performing Arts (Dance).

References 

Dance, Bachelor